Social privilege is a theory of special advantage or entitlement, which benefits one person, often to the detriment of others. Privileged groups can be advantaged based on education, social class, caste, age, height, weight, nationality, geographic location, disability, ethnic or racial category, gender, gender identity, neurology, sexual orientation, physical attractiveness, religion, and other differentiating factors.  It is generally considered to be a theoretical concept used in a variety of subjects and often linked to social inequality. Privilege is also linked to social and cultural forms of power. It began as an academic concept, but has since been invoked more widely, outside of academia.

This subject is based on the interactions of different forms of privilege within certain situations. Furthermore, it must be understood as the inverse of social inequality, in that it focuses on how power structures in society aid societally privileged people, as opposed to how those structures oppress others.

History

Writings of W. E. B. Du Bois

Arguably, the history of privilege as a concept dates back to American sociologist and historian W. E. B. Du Bois's 1903 book The Souls of Black Folk. Here, he wrote that although African Americans were observant of white Americans and conscious of racial discrimination, white Americans did not think much about African-Americans, nor about the effects of racial discrimination. In 1935, Du Bois wrote about what he called the "wages of whiteness" held by white Americans. He wrote that these included courtesy and deference, unimpeded admittance to all public functions, lenient treatment in court, and access to the best schools.

Codification of the concept
Early concepts that would lead to the term White Privilege were developed by the Weather Underground in the 1960s. In 1988, American feminist and anti-racism activist Peggy McIntosh published "White Privilege and Male Privilege: A Personal Account of Coming to See Correspondences through Work in Women's Studies". Here, McIntosh documented forty-six privileges which she, as a white person, experienced in the United States. As an example, "I can be sure that if I need legal or medical help, my race will not work against me", and "I do not have to educate my children to be aware of systemic racism for their own daily physical protection". McIntosh described white privilege as an "invisible package of unearned assets" which white people do not want to acknowledge, and which leads to them being confident, comfortable, and oblivious about racial issues, while non-white people become unconfident, uncomfortable, and alienated. McIntosh's essay has been credited for stimulating academic interest in privilege, which has been extensively studied in the decades since.

Overview 
Historically, academic study of social inequality focused mainly on the ways in which minority groups were discriminated against, and ignored the privileges accorded to dominant social groups. That changed in the late 1980s, when researchers began studying the concept of privilege.

Privilege, as understood and described by researchers, is a function of multiple variables of varying importance, such as race, age, gender, sexual orientation, gender identity, neurology, citizenship, religion, physical ability, health, level of education, and others. Race and gender tend to have the highest impacts given that one is born with these characteristics and they are immediately visible. However, religion, sexuality and physical ability are also highly relevant.  Some such as social class are relatively stable and others, such as age, wealth, religion and attractiveness, will or may change over time. Some attributes of privilege are at least partly determined by the individual, such as level of education, whereas others such as race or class background are entirely involuntary.

American sociologist Michael S. Kimmel uses the metaphor of a wind to explain the concept. He explains that when you walk into the wind you have to struggle for each step that you take. When you walk with the wind, you do not feel the wind at all but you still move faster than you would otherwise. The wind is social privilege and if it flows with you, it simply propels you forward with little effort of your own.

In the context of the theory, privileged people are considered to be "the norm", and, as such, gain invisibility and ease in society, with others being cast as inferior variants. Privileged people see themselves reflected throughout society both in mass media and face-to-face in their encounters with teachers, workplace managers and other authorities, which researchers argue leads to a sense of entitlement and the assumption that the privileged person will succeed in life, as well as protecting the privileged person from worry that they may face discrimination from people in positions of authority.

Awareness of privilege 
Some academics, such as Peggy McIntosh, highlight a pattern where those who benefit from a type of privilege are unwilling to acknowledge it. The argument may follow that such a denial constitutes a further injustice against those who do not benefit from the same form of privilege. Derald Wing Sue has referred to such denial as a form of "microaggression" or microinvalidation that negates the experiences of people who do not have privilege and minimizes the impediments they face.

McIntosh wrote that most people are reluctant to acknowledge their privilege, and instead look for ways to justify or minimize the effects of privilege stating that their privilege was fully earned. They justify this by acknowledging the acts of individuals of unearned dominance, but deny that privilege is institutionalized as well as embedded throughout our society. She wrote that those who believe privilege is systemic may nonetheless deny having personally benefited from it, and may oppose efforts to dismantle it. According to researchers, privileged individuals resist acknowledging their privileges because doing so would require them to acknowledge that whatever success they have achieved did not result solely through their own efforts. Instead it was partly due to a system that has developed to support them. The concept of privilege calls into question the idea that society is a meritocracy, which researchers have argued is particularly unsettling for Americans for whom belief that they live in a meritocracy is a deeply held cultural value, and one that researchers commonly characterize as a myth.

In The Gendered Society, Michael Kimmel wrote that when people at all levels of privilege do not feel personally powerful, arguments that they have benefited from unearned advantages seem unpersuasive.

Examples of forms of privilege

Educational racism
Racism is the belief that groups of humans possess different behavioral traits corresponding to physical appearance and can be divided based on the superiority of one race over another. This can result in particular ethnic and cultural groups having privileged access to a multitude of resources and opportunities, including education and work positions.

Educational racism has been entrenched in American society since the creation of the United States of America. A system of laws in the 18th and 19th century known as the Black Codes, criminalized the access to education for black people. Until the introduction of the Thirteenth Amendment to the United States Constitution, the Fourteenth Amendment to the United States Constitution and the Civil Rights Act of 1866, seeking out an education was punishable by the law for them. This thus served to keep African Americans illiterate and only value them as a workforce. However, even after these institutional and legal changes, African Americans were still targeted by educational racism in the form of school segregation in the United States. In the 20th century the fight against educational racism reached its climax with the landmark Supreme Court case Brown v. Board of Education.

Educational racism also took other forms throughout history such as the creation of Canadian Indian residential school system in 1831, which forcefully integrated indigenous children into schools aimed at erasing their ethnic, linguistic and cultural specificities in order to assimilate them into a white settler society. Until the last residential school closed in 1996, Canada had an educational system which specifically harmed and targeted indigenous children. An estimated 6,000 children died under that system.

Nowadays the opportunity gap pinpoints how educational racism is present in societies. The term refers to "the ways in which race, ethnicity, socioeconomic status, English proficiency, community wealth, familial situations, or other factors contribute to or perpetuate lower educational aspirations, achievement, and attainment for certain groups of students." In other words, it is "the disparity in access to quality schools and the resources needed for all children to be academically successful." Concretely this can be seen in the United States by considering how, according to the Schott Foundation's Opportunity to Learn Index, "students from historically disadvantaged families have just a 51 percent Opportunity to Learn when compared to White, non-Latino students."

According to McKinley et al.
Students of color are pushed toward academic failure and continued social disenfranchisement. Racist policies and beliefs, in part, explain why children and young adults from racially marginalized groups fail to achieve academically at the same rate as their White peers.

Heterosexual privilege 
Heterosexual privilege can be defined as "the rights and unearned advantages bestowed on heterosexuals in society". There are both institutional and cultural forces encouraging heterosexuality in society. Sexual orientation is a repeated romantic, sexual or emotional attraction to one or multiple genders. There are a variety of categories including heterosexual, gay, lesbian, and bisexual. Heterosexual is considered the normative form of sexual orientation.

Heterosexual privilege is based in the existence of homophobia in society, particularly at the individual level. Between 2014 and 2018, 849 sexual orientation related hate crimes were committed in Canada. Despite the fact that Canada legalized same-sex marriage in 2005 and has enshrined the protection of the human rights of all people of all sexual orientations, there is still societal bias against those who do not conform to heterosexuality.

Beyond this, institutions such as marriage stop homosexual partners from accessing each other's health insurance, tax benefits or adopting a child together. Same sex marriage is legal in only 27 countries, mostly in the northern hemisphere. This results in an inability for non-heterosexual couples to benefit from the institutional structures that are based on heterosexuality, resulting in privilege for those who are heterosexual.

Intersectionality 
Privilege theory argues that each individual is embedded in a matrix of categories and contexts, and will be in some ways privileged and other ways disadvantaged, with privileged attributes lessening disadvantage and membership in a disadvantaged group lessening the benefits of privilege. This can be further supported by the idea of intersectionality, which was coined by Kimberle Crenshaw in 1989. When applying intersectionality to the concept of social privilege, it can be understood as the way one form of privilege can be mitigated by other areas in which a person lacks privilege, for example, a black man who has male privilege but no white privilege. It is also argued that members of privileged social identity groups often do not recognize their advantages.

Intersections of forms of identity can either enhance privilege or decrease its effects. Psychological analysis has found that people tend to frame their lives on different elements of their identity and therefore frame their lives through the privilege they do or do not have. However, this analysis also found that this framing was stronger amongst certain nationalities, suggesting that identity and privilege may be more central in certain countries. Often people construct themselves in relation to the majority, so ties to identity and therefore degrees of privilege can be stronger for more marginalized groups.

It is important to note that forms of privilege one might have can actually be decreased by the presence of other factors. For example, the feminization of a gay man may reduce his male privilege in addition to already lacking heterosexual privilege. When acknowledging privilege, multifaceted situations must be understood individually. Privilege is a nuanced notion and an intersectional understanding helps bridge gaps in the original analysis.

Criticism 
The concept of privilege has been criticized for ignoring relative differences among groups. For example, Lawrence Blum argued that in American culture there are status differences among Chinese, Japanese, Indians, Koreans, and Cambodians, and among African Americans, black immigrants from the Caribbean, and black immigrants from Africa.

Blum agreed that privilege exists and is systemic yet nonetheless criticized the label itself, saying that the word "privilege" implies luxuries rather than rights, and arguing that some benefits of privilege such as unimpeded access to education and housing would be better understood as rights; Blum suggested that privilege theory should distinguish between "spared injustice" and "unjust enrichment" as some effects of being privileged are the former and others the latter. Blum also argued that privilege can end up homogenising both privileged and non-privileged groups when in fact it needs to take account the role of interacting effects and an individual's multiple group identities. "White privilege", Michael Monahan argued, would be more accurately described as the advantages gained by whites through historical disenfranchisement of non-whites rather than something that gives whites privilege above and beyond normal human status.

Psychologist Erin Cooley reported in a study published in 2019 that reading about white privilege decreased social liberals' sympathy for poor whites and increased their will to punish/blame but did not increase their sympathy for poor blacks.

See also
Ableism
Body privilege
Caste
Christian privilege
First World privilege
Horizontal inequality
Ingroups and outgroups
Male privilege
Nobility
Social justice

Further reading

References

 
Critical theory
Feminist terminology
Feminist theory
Gender equality
Identity politics
Post-structuralism
Social justice terminology
Majority–minority relations